The women's shot put event  at the 1996 European Athletics Indoor Championships was held in Stockholm Globe Arena on 9 March.

Results

References

Detailed results

Shot put at the European Athletics Indoor Championships
Shot
1996 in women's athletics